The Jumbo Mark II-class ferries are a series of ferries built for Washington State Ferries (WSF) between 1997 and 1999, at Todd Pacific Shipyards in Seattle. Each ferry can carry up to 2,500 passengers and 202 vehicles, making them the largest ferries in the fleet, and the second longest double-ended ferries in the world.  They all have full galley service and a "quiet room" upstairs.

Ferries in this class include:

 Puyallup
 Tacoma
 Wenatchee

In 2019, WSF decided to convert them to battery electric propulsion by switching two of the four engines in each ferry with batteries, starting with Wenatchee.

References

External links 
 Washington State Ferries class information

Washington State Ferries vessel classes
Ferry classes